This is a list of northern resident orca pods that live off the coast of British Columbia, Canada as of March 2013. The Northern resident community is found in coastal waters ranging from mid-Vancouver Island north to the Queen Charlotte Islands and southeastern Alaska. Northern residents live in close-knit family groups known as pods that frequently split into subpods during the winter months and feed only on fish. They have never been seen spending time with other communities, although their territories often overlap.

Pods
Population of Orcas that live of British Columbia.

Asterisk indicates deceased member.

Bibliography

References

Orcas
Cetaceans of the Pacific Ocean